This list comprises all players who have participated in at least one league match for El Paso Patriots (formally Chivas El Paso Patriots (2010-11)) in the USL since the league began keeping detailed records in 2003. Players who were on the roster but never played a first team game are not listed; players who appeared for the team in other competitions (US Open Cup, etc.) but never actually made an USL appearance are noted at the bottom of the page where appropriate.

A "*" indicates a player known to have appeared for the team prior to 2003.

A
  José Abarca
  Richard Abrego
  Agustin Aguilera
  Roland Alexander
  Scott Alexander
  Mario Alvarez
  Lourenço Andrade de Souza
  Víctor Arreóla
  Martin Arrieta
  Francisco Arroyo

B
  Andrew Barragan
  Rodrigo Barragan Salinas
  Hugo Barraza
  António Barrera
  Aldo Bautista
  Eduardo Bilbáo
  Jorge Briones
  Oscar Burciaga-Meraz

C
  Paul Cabrera
  Jonathan Camarena
  Mário Cardiél
  Javier Carrasco
  Ignacio Carrillo
  Daniel Castañeda
  Fabien Castañeda
  Luis Castañeda
  Joaquin Castro
  Enrique Cervantes
  Gabriel Chacon
  Ariél Chavez
  Luis Coronel
  Omar Correra-Luna
  John Crawley
  Jamie Cunningham

D
  Paul Davalos
  Francisco De Anda
  David De La Torre
  Jose Hamlet Diaz
  Dimitar Dimitrov
  Carlos Dominguez
  Sidnei Dos Santos
  Fabio Dos Santos-Terra
  Jorge Duarte
  Mugurel Dumitru

E
  Trevor Eastman
  Dario Espinal
  Alfredo Estrada
  Ben Everson

F
  Alessandro Faria *
  Carlos Farias*
  Jessie Fernandez
  Ahmed Figueroa-Jimenez
  Robert Fite
  Ricky Francis
  Julio Daniel Frías

G
  Antonio Gamboa
  Jimmy Garcia
  Mário Garcia
  Bisser Georgiev
  Anuar Gomez
  Leonel Gonzalez
  Dominik Green
  Michael Griego

H
  Angel Hernandez
  Hilario Hernandez
  Juan Hernandez
  Nestor Hernandez-Fraire
  Adam Hooi

J
  Jeffrey Jennings
  Freddy Juarez

L
  Christian Landa
  Miguel Larrosa-Sauco
  Gustavo Leal
  Jose Lomeli
  Brit Lopez
  Edgar Lopez
  Sem Lopez
  Aaron Lujan

M
  Luis Macias
  Roberto Macias
  Carlos Martinez
  Moisés Martínez
  Cesar Mata
  Guillermo McFarlane
  Edgar Mendoza
  Salvador Mercado
  Ivan Meza
  Omar Millan-Guerra
  Omar Mora
  Gerardo Moreira
  Adrián Moreno
  Rodrigo Morín
  Sergio Morin-Dominguez
  Jorge Muñiz

N
  Junro Narita
  Oscar Narvaez
  Sebastian Narvaez
  Kevin Noleen

O
  Mobi Obaraku
  Jair Olivares
  Victor Olivares Garcia
  Isaac Ontiveros
  Jorge Orona
  Kevin Onwudiwe

P
  Estéban Palácios
  Michael Pepe            
  Tim Pierce
  Santiago Pinedo
  Guillermo Ponce
  Dimitar Popov*
  Christopher Purertas

R
  Edgar Retana
  Sergio Rios
  Roberto Rivera-Solis
  Mark Roland
  Maurizio Rocha
  Colin Rocke *
  Allan Rodarte
  Efren Rodarte *
  Hector Rodriguez
  Luis Rodriguez
  Edgar Rosales
  Diego Ruiz
  Jesus Ruiz

S
  Eric Saavedra Carmond
  Hugo Samano Contreras
  Mariano Sapien
  Steve Sengelmann*
  David Solares
  Dave Stewart*
  Marcus Shepard*

T
  Paul Tate
  Omar Tena
  Cesar Torres

U
  Keegan Uderitz

V
  Victor Valle
  Heriberto J. Vazquez
  Armando Villar
  Omar Villa-Rojas
  Guillermo Villela
  Dimitar Vasev

W
  Eric Wilson*
  Kirk Wilson*

Y
  Craig Yacks

Z
  Cristian Zamora

Sources

2010 Chivas El Paso Patriots player stats
2009 El Paso Patriots player stats
2008 El Paso Patriots player stats
2007 El Paso Patriots player stats
2006 El Paso Patriots player stats
2005 El Paso Patriots player stats
2004 El Paso Patriots player stats
2003 El Paso Patriots player stats

References

El Paso Patriots
 
Association football player non-biographical articles